100 Mile Rule is a 2002 comedy film directed by Brent Huff.

Premise
Three salesmen from Detroit come to Los Angeles for a two-week seminar and get themselves involved in a world of trouble when their 'fun' snowballs into a roller-coaster ride of secrets, guilt, peer pressure and stupidity.

External links

2002 films
2002 comedy films
American comedy films
2000s English-language films
2000s American films